Julião (Portuguese for Julian) may refer to:

People

Given name
 Julião Mateus Paulo (born 1942), Angolan politician
 Julião Sarmento (1948-2021), Portuguese multimedia artist and painter
 Julião da Kutonda (1965-2004), Angolan football defender
 Julião Neto (born 1981), Brazilian flyweight boxer
 Julião Gaspar (born 1981), Angolan handball player
 Juliao Monteiro (born 1993), East Timorese football goalkeeper
 Julião (footballer, born 1998), Julião dos Reis Mendonça, East Timorese football defender

Surname
 Pedro Julião (1215-1277), Pope John XXI, Portuguese head of the Catholic Church
 Carlos Julião (1740-1811), Italian artist and engineer
 Evaristo Sourdis Juliao (1905-1970), Colombian lawyer and politician
 Francisco Julião (1915-1999), Brazilian lawyer, politician and writer
 Julião (footballer, born 1929), Antonio Elías Julião, Brazilian football midfielder
 David Sánchez Juliao (1945-2011), Colombian author and journalist
 Ronald Julião (born 1985), Brazilian shotputter
 Igor Julião (born 1994), Brazilian football right-back

Places
 Ribeira Julião, a village in São Vicente, Cape Verde
 Ribeira de Julião, a stream in São Vicente, Cape Verde

See also
 Julian (disambiguation)
 São Julião (disambiguation)